Central Plaza One a skyscraper in the city of Brisbane, Queensland, Australia, was designed by renowned Japanese architect Kurokawa Kisho.
The height of the tower is 174 m (571 ft) and it contains 44 floors.

Construction was completed in 1988 and it became synonymous with Australian Bicentenary and World Expo '88 Brisbane. It is located at 345 Queen Street on the corner of Creek Street in the Brisbane central business district. The building is owned by Industry Superannuation Property Trust, who bought the building for $385 million.

At the time of its completion it was the tallest building in Brisbane, holding this title until Riparian Plaza's completion in 2005.

Located next to Central Plaza One is a smaller version of the tower with a similar design, Central Plaza Two, which has a height of 110 m. In 2008, Central Plaza Three was built to 57 metres, completing the Central Plaza Complex.

Central Plaza One has a unique window cleaning mechanism in which a section at the top of the building rotates, allowing for the suspension of outdoor window cleaners.

Plush foyers, a striking facade and the integration of advanced technology systems have resulted in the structure being described as one of the most iconic in Australia.

AAMI Insurance signs located outside and on top of the building as well as retail branch on the bottom floor had resulted in Central Plaza 1 being nicknamed the AAMI Building. However the centre has since gone under management by JLL (Jones Lang LaSalle) and now displays their signs on top and on the ground levels of Central Plaza 1.

See also

List of tallest buildings in Brisbane

References

External links
Central Plaza Online

Skyscrapers in Brisbane
Office buildings in Brisbane
Office buildings completed in 1988
Queen Street, Brisbane
Skyscraper office buildings in Australia
Creek Street, Brisbane